Sami is a town and a municipality on the island of Cephalonia, Ionian Islands, Greece. Since the 2019 local government reform it is one of the three municipalities on the island. It is located on the central east coast of the island.  The municipality has an area of 291.2 km2 and the municipal unit (the pre-2010 municipality) has an area of 129.326 km². The 2011 census recorded a population of 2,341 in the municipal unit, and 5,204 in the municipality in its post-2019 extension. Its population was 2,341 at the 2011 census. Its municipal seat is the town of Sámi (pop. 1,025). Its next largest towns are Karavomylos (385), Grizáta (362) and Digaleto (316).

West of town is the Melissani Cave, a major tourist attraction; boat tours are offered.

History

Administration
Following the Kapodistrias reform of 1997, the community of Sami was united with the surrounding communities Grizata, Karavomylos, Poulata, Pyrgi and Chaliotata to form the larger municipality of Sami. As a result of the 2010 Kallikratis Programme, this municipality became a municipal unit of the municipality of Kefalonia, which covered the whole island. In 2019 three new municipalities were formed on the island, including Sami.

The municipality of Sami consists of the following municipal units (former municipalities):
 Erisos
 Pylaros
 Sami

The municipal unit of Sami is subdivided into the following communities:
Chaliotata
Grizata
Karavomylos
Poulata 
Pyrgi (Digaleto)
Sami

Province

Sami Province was one of the provinces of Cephalonia Prefecture. Its territory corresponded with that of the current municipality Sami. It was abolished in 2006.

References

External links
Sami Kefalonia | Tourist Guide KefaloniaVisit.com
Official website 

Populated places in Cephalonia
Municipalities of the Ionian Islands (region)
Provinces of Greece